The 2016 FIM Motocross World Championship was the 60th FIM Motocross World Championship season. It included 19 events, starting at Losail in Qatar on 27 February, and ending at San Bernardino, California in the United States on 11 September.
In the main MXGP class, Romain Febvre was the defending champion after taking his first title in 2015. In the MX2 class, Tim Gajser was the defending champion, after taking his first title in 2015.

Race calendar and results
A 19-round calendar for the 2016 season was announced on 14 October 2015.

MXGP

MX2

WMX

Participants

MXGP

MX2

 – Tanel Leok and Karel Kutsar were using standard shop motorcycles at the first round in Qatar and at the second round in Thailand.

Championship standings

MXGP

Riders' championship

Manufacturers' championship

MX2

Riders' championship

Manufacturers' championship

References

External links

 
2016
2016 in motorcycle sport